Ng Kim Chew (born 1967) is a Chinese-Malaysian author of short fiction and literary scholar who lives in Taiwan.

Life
Born in Johor, Malaysia, Ng migrated to Taiwan to attend National Taiwan University in 1989. After earning his doctorate from National Tsing Hua University, Ng became a professor of Chinese literature at National Chi Nan University.

Career
Despite residing and publishing in Taiwan, Ng's short fiction is largely set in Southeast Asia. His stories explore language and literary history, interethnic and religious politics, indigenous and diasporic nationalism, exile, migration, and hybridity. Ng's short fiction is typically highly ironic, satirical, and farcical.

Ng has published several short story collections. He has won numerous awards for his fiction, including the United Daily Literary Award and the China Times Literary Award. In 2021, Ng was awarded the Émile Guimet Prize for Asian Literature for his collection of short stories, Rain (雨).

Selected works

Works in Chinese
 Dreams, Pigs, and Dawn (1994)
 Dark Nights (1997)
 From Island to Island: Carved Spins (2001)
 Earth and Fire: The Land of the Malay People (2005)
 Die in the South (2007)
 Memorandums of the South Seas People's Republic (2013)
 Carved Back (2014)
 Still Seeing Fuyu (2014)
 Fish (2015)
 Rain (2016)
 Slow Boat to China (2019)
 The River Where Elephants Died (2021)

Translated works
 Slow Boat to China and Other Stories (Columbia University Press, 2016), translated by Carlos Rojas
 Pluie (Philippe Picquier Publishing), 2020), translated by Pierre-Mong Lim

References

Further reading
Carlos Rojas: Language, Ethnicity, and the Politics of Literary Taxonomy: Ng Kim Chew and Mahua Literature, published online by Cambridge University Press 23 October 2020

1967 births
Malaysian writers
Living people
Malaysian people of Hokkien descent
Malaysian people of Chinese descent
National Taiwan University alumni
Tsinghua University alumni
Malaysian emigrants to Taiwan
Academic staff of the National Chi Nan University